Lamas de Mouro is a former civil parish in the municipality of Melgaço in the Viana do Castelo District, Portugal. In 2013, the parish merged into the new parish Castro Laboreiro e Lamas de Mouro. It has a population of 148 inhabitants and a total area of 17.31 km2.

Climate
Lamas de Mouro has a cool Mediterranean climate with significant oceanic influences. On average, it has the coldest summer nights out of any populated place in Portugal.

References

Freguesias of Melgaço, Portugal